The North Bass Trail is a hiking trail located on the North Rim of the Grand Canyon, in Grand Canyon National Park, located in the U.S. state of Arizona.

Access
The trail is accessible by use of U.S. Forest Service roads along the north rim of Grand Canyon.  The trailhead is located in the remote backcountry of the forests on the canyon's the north rim.  To reach it, an 18-mile drive by high-clearance (4-wheel drive preferred) vehicles is required.  The trail begins at Swamp Point at an elevation of 7,500 feet at the end of Swamp Point Road.

Description

This 14-mile trail is considered difficult, primarily due to length and elevation. Until recently the trail was very eroded and required considerable route-finding expertise.  A major reconstruction effort by a volunteer crew in 2005 restored much of the original trailbed, improving travel and navigation, but still one of the Canyon's most strenuous trails and providing access to an exceptional wilderness area.

No services are available, water sources include perennial flow in Shinumo Creek and at the Colorado River, which must be treated before consuming.

History
At one time, this trail was connected to the South Bass Trail via a cable and platform that crossed the Colorado River.  The tramway no longer exists, and river crossing can only be made by raft.

See also
 Geology of the Grand Canyon area
 List of trails in Grand Canyon National Park
 North Rim of the Grand Canyon

References

External links
 Official  Grand Canyon National Park website
 National Park Service factsheet
 Hike Arizona
 OpenStreetMap
 OpenStreetMap GPX file

Grand Canyon, North Rim
Hiking trails in Grand Canyon National Park
Grand Canyon, North Rim (west)